Namrup College, established in 1973, is a general degree college situated at Parbatpur, Namrup in Dibrugarh district, Assam. This college is affiliated with the Dibrugarh University.

Departments

Science
Physics
Chemistry
Mathematics
Computer Science
Botany
Zoology

Arts
 Assamese
 English
History
Education
Economics
Political Science
Sociology

References

External links

Universities and colleges in Assam
Colleges affiliated to Dibrugarh University
Educational institutions established in 1973
1973 establishments in Assam